(?–November 11, 1751) was the chief retainer of the Banshū Ako Domain, held by the Asano family. His annual earnings were 650 koku.

Biography
He was a bureaucrat specializing in economic affairs. He demonstrated skill in managing the domain's finances and the development of reclaimed land for rice cultivation. He was eventually promoted to karō (executive) as a result of his distinguished service.

In 1701, his lord Asano Naganori wounded Kira Kōzuke no Suke, and was sentenced to commit seppuku, which resulted in the elimination of Asano control of the domain.

Ōno consulted his principal retainer, Ōishi Yoshio. Ōno insisted on surrendering to the Tokugawa shogunate, whereas Ōishi and other retainers insisted on defending the castle. However, Ōno insisted on the necessity of distributing remaining money according to annual earnings, while Ōishi insisted on favoring those with lower incomes. It was distributed according to Ōishi's wish.

In the matter of exchange of domainal paper currency (hansatsu), Ōno was opposed to Okajima Yasōemon, and ran away by ship, putting household effects on his house. Since he panicked, he kept his young daughter placed in the house. Afterwards, he lived near the Ninna-ji, a temple in Kyoto, and he was called Bankannshō. It is unknown for certain when he died, but in Matsugishi Temple located in Annaka, Gunma Prefecture, a gravestone dates his death to the twenty-fourth day of the ninth month, 1751.

1751 deaths
Samurai
Year of birth unknown
Place of birth unknown